The Noorderkerk ("northern church") is a 17th-century Protestant church in Amsterdam, The Netherlands. A number of other towns in the Netherlands also have a Noorderkerk church, including The Hague, Hoorn and Kampen.

History
The church was built in the years 1620–1623 to serve the rapidly growing population of the new Jordaan neighbourhood. The Jordaan already had a church, the Westerkerk, but the city government decided that a second church should be built to serve the northern part of the neighbourhood. The Noorderkerk became the church for the common people, while the Westerkerk was used mainly by the middle and upper classes.

The architect was Hendrick de Keyser, who also designed the Zuiderkerk and Westerkerk, among others. After de Keyser's death in 1621, his son Pieter de Keyser took over and oversaw the completion.

While the Zuiderkerk and Westerkerk have a more traditional basilica design, the Noorderkerk has a symmetrical, cross-shaped layout, reflecting the ideals of the Renaissance and protestantism. De Keyser's unique design combines an octagonal floor plan with a structure shaped like a Greek cross, with four arms of equal length. Annex buildings occupy each corner of the cross, and a small tower sits in the centre of the cross. Large Tuscan pillars dominate the church interior.

The church was restored in the period 1993–1998. The small tower was restored in 2003–2004 and the organ, built in 1849 by H. Knipscheer, was restored in 2005. The bell tower was built in 1621 by J. Meurs. The church is still used for Dutch Reformed Church services and is also used regularly for classical music concerts.

The Noorderkerk is located along Prinsengracht canal, on the Noordermarkt square, where regular markets are held, including an organic farmer's market on Saturdays. In 1941, illicit public meetings were held on the square by organisers of the February Strike. This is commemorated by a plaque on the south face of the church.

Burials
Caspar Stoll

References

External links
Amsterdam Heritage
Noorderkerk (Dutch)

Bell towers in the Netherlands
Churches in Amsterdam
Buildings of the Dutch Golden Age
Rijksmonuments in Amsterdam
Religious buildings and structures completed in 1623
Protestant churches in the Netherlands
1623 establishments in the Dutch Republic
Towers in Amsterdam